Kendall Thomas is Nash Professor of Law, and Director of the Center for the Study of Law and Culture, at Columbia Law School. 

He won a Berlin Prize Fellowship from the American Academy in Berlin.

Works
 Thomas, Kendall. Seriam os direitos dos transgêneros direitos Inumanos? RDFD, 2017, volume=22, series=1, pages=4-23
http://revistaeletronicardfd.unibrasil.com.br/index.php/rdfd/article/view/1032x
https://doi.org/10.25192/issn.1982-0496.rdfd.v22i11032

References

External links

Columbia Law School faculty
Berlin Prize recipients